The following highways are numbered 351:

Canada
Manitoba Provincial Road 351
Newfoundland and Labrador Route 351
Prince Edward Island Route 351
 Quebec Route 351

Japan
 Japan National Route 351

India
 National Highway 351

United States
  Arkansas Highway 351
  County Road 351 (Dixie County, Florida)
  County Road 351A (Dixie County, Florida)
  Georgia State Route 351 (former)
  Illinois Route 351
  Kentucky Route 351
  Louisiana Highway 351
  Maryland Route 351
 New York:
  New York State Route 351
 New York State Route 351 (former)
 County Route 351 (Albany County, New York)
Oklahoma State Highway 351 also known as Muskogee Turnpike
  Oregon Route 351
  Pennsylvania Route 351
  Puerto Rico Highway 351
  Tennessee State Route 351
  Texas State Highway 351
  Virginia State Route 351
 Virginia State Route 351 (former)
  Wisconsin Highway 351 (former)
  Wyoming Highway 351